Martti Luomanen (5 March 1907 – 4 April 1989) was a Finnish middle-distance runner. He competed in the men's 1500 metres at the 1932 Summer Olympics.

References

1907 births
1989 deaths
Athletes (track and field) at the 1932 Summer Olympics
Finnish male middle-distance runners
Olympic athletes of Finland
Place of birth missing